Nuria Llagostera Vives and María José Martínez Sánchez were the defending champions, but they chose not to compete this year.
First seeded Nadia Petrova and Katarina Srebotnik defeated Monica Niculescu and Klára Zakopalová in the final with the score 6–3, 6–3.

Seeds

Draw

Draw

External links
 Main draw

Aegon Internationalandnbsp;- Doubles
2013 Women's Doubles